Peter Johannes Gertrudis Winnen (born 5 September 1957) is a Dutch former road racing cyclist. He competed at the 1980 Summer Olympics in road racing and finished in 26th place. After the Games he turned professional in 1981. Among his 14 victories were two stages at Alpe d'Huez in the Tour de France and a national championship. He came third in the Tour de France in 1983.

Doping confession
On the Dutch TV-show Reporter, Steven Rooks, Maarten Ducrot and Winnen admitted taking doping in their careers. Winnen talked about his Tour in 1986. "I was very bad and had the choice: go back to home or to provide me with testosterone." – Winnen reached Paris. During his career with Raleigh, Panasonic and Buckler, Winnen used testosterone, amphetamines and corticosteroids.

Career achievements

Major results

1979
1st Stage 4 Tour de Liège
1981
5th Overall Tour de France
1st  Young rider classification
1st Stage 19
1982
4th Overall Tour de France:
1st Stage 18
1983
3rd Overall Tour de France:
1st Stage 17
2nd Overall Tour de Suisse
1st Stage 4
1987
2nd Overall Tour de Suisse
1st Stage 7
8th Overall Giro d'Italia
1988
9th Overall Tour de France
1st Stage 2 (TTT)
8th Overall Giro d'Italia
1990
1st  Dutch National Road Race Championship
 1st Profronde van Heerlen

Grand Tour general classification results timeline

See also
 List of Dutch Olympic cyclists
 List of doping cases in cycling

References

External links 

Official Tour de France results for Peter Winnen

1957 births
Living people
Cyclists at the 1980 Summer Olympics
Doping cases in cycling
Dutch male cyclists
Dutch Tour de France stage winners
Dutch sportspeople in doping cases
Olympic cyclists of the Netherlands
People from Venray
Tour de Suisse stage winners
Cyclists from Limburg (Netherlands)